"America's Favorite Architecture" is a list of buildings and other structures identified as the most popular works of architecture in the United States.

In 2006 and 2007, the American Institute of Architects (AIA) sponsored research to identify the most popular works of architecture in the United States. Harris Interactive conducted the study by first polling a sample of the AIA membership and later polling a sample of the public. 

In the first phase of the study, 2,448 AIA members were interviewed and asked to identify their "favorite" structures. Each was asked to name up to 20 structures in each of 15 defined categories. The 248 structures that were named by at least six of the AIA members were then included in a list of structures to be included in the next phase, a survey of the general public. The survey of the public involved a total of 2,214 people, each of whom rated many photographs of buildings and other structures drawn from the list of 248 structures that had been created by polling the architects. The public's preferences were ranked using a "likeability" scale developed for the study.

As part of the commemoration of the organization's 150th anniversary in 2007, the AIA announced the list of the 150 highest-ranked structures as "America's Favorite Architecture". New York City is the location of 32 structures on the list, more than any other place. Of the 10 top-ranked structures, 6 are in Washington, DC, which is the location of 17 of the 150 structures on the complete list. Chicago has 16 structures on the list.

The 150 top-ranked structures are listed below.

List of "America's Favorites"

Criticisms 

When it was released, critics observed that the list of "favorites" did not reflect the judgments of architectural “experts”. Upon the list's release, AIA president R.K. Stewart acknowledged that the rankings did not represent architects' professional judgments, but instead reflected people's "emotional connections" to buildings. Buildings named by critics as being some that architects consider to be highly significant, but that did not achieve top 150 ranking in the public survey, included the Salk Institute in La Jolla, California, designed by Louis Kahn; the Inland Steel and John Hancock buildings in Chicago; Washington Dulles International Airport in Chantilly, Virginia, designed by Eero Saarinen; and the Seagram Building in New York City, designed by Ludwig Mies van der Rohe. John King of the San Francisco Chronicle pointed out that in 1991 the AIA had named Eero Saarinen's design for Dulles Airport as one of ten "all-time works of American architects." King noted that the public's ratings were based on seeing just one photo of each building, and pointed out that "There's more to architecture than a picture can convey."

Structures ranked below the top 150 
The 98 buildings that were listed by architects as significant, but did not rank in the top 150 in the public vote, were:

 860–880 Lake Shore Drive Apartments – Chicago, Illinois
American Folk Art Museum – New York City
Art & Architecture Building – Yale University, New Haven, Connecticut
Baker House – Massachusetts Institute of Technology, Cambridge, Massachusetts
Beinecke Rare Book Library – Yale University, New Haven, Connecticut
Beth Sholom Synagogue – Elkins Park, Pennsylvania
Boston City Hall – Boston, Massachusetts
Bradbury Building – Los Angeles, California
Burton Barr Library – Phoenix Public Library, Phoenix, Arizona
Carpenter Center for the Visual Arts – Harvard University, Cambridge, Massachusetts
Cathedral of Our Lady of the Angels – Los Angeles
Cathedral of Saint Mary of the Assumption – San Francisco
CBS Headquarters/ Black Rock – New York City
Yale Center for British Art/Museum of British Art – Yale University, New Haven, Connecticut
Chapel/W15 – Massachusetts Institute of Technology, Cambridge, Massachusetts
Chapel of St. Ignatius – Seattle University, Seattle
Crown Hall – Illinois Institute of Technology (IIT), Chicago
Dallas City Hall – Dallas, Texas
Dallas/Fort Worth International Airport – Dallas, Texas
M. H. de Young Memorial Museum – San Francisco
Denver Art Museum – Denver, Colorado
Denver Public Library – Denver, Colorado
Eames House – Pacific Palisades, California
Ennis House/Ennis-Brown House – Los Angeles
Esherick House – Chestnut Hill, Pennsylvania
Experience Music Project – Seattle 
Farnsworth House – Plano, Illinois
First Christian Church – Columbus, Indiana
First Church of Christ Scientist – Berkeley, California
First Unitarian Church of Rochester – Rochester, New York
Ford Foundation Building – New York City
Frank Gehry Residence – Santa Monica, California
Freer Gallery of Art – Washington, DC
Genzyme Center – Cambridge, Massachusetts
Gropius House – Lincoln, Massachusetts
Guaranty Building – Buffalo, New York
Horton Plaza – San Diego
IBM Building – Chicago
Inland Steel Building – Chicago
Jacobs Field – Cleveland, Ohio
John Deere World Headquarters – Moline, Illinois
John Hancock Center – Chicago
Johnson Wax Building – Racine, Wisconsin
Kaufmann Desert House – Palm Springs, California
Kimbell Art Museum – Fort Worth, Texas
Kings Road House – West Hollywood, California
Larkin Administration Building – Buffalo, New York
Lever House – New York City
Lovell Beach House – Newport Beach, California
R. H. Macy and Company Store (building) – New York City
Marin County Civic Center – San Rafael, California
Marshall Field and Company Building – Chicago
Menil Collection – Houston, Texas
Minneapolis Central Library – Minneapolis
Modern Art Museum of Fort Worth – Fort Worth, Texas
Monadnock Building – Chicago
Morgan Library & Museum – New York City
Mount Angel Library – Mount Angel, Oregon
Museum of Contemporary Art, Los Angeles
Museum of Fine Arts, Houston
Nasher Sculpture Center – Dallas
National Gallery of Art (East Wing) – Washington, DC
North Christian Church – Columbus, Indiana
Oakland Museum of California – Oakland, California
O'Hare International Airport – Chicago
Peabody Terrace – Harvard University, Cambridge, Massachusetts
Petco Park (San Diego Padres) – San Diego
Philadelphia Savings Fund Society Building/PSFS – Philadelphia
Philip Johnson's Glass House – New Canaan, Connecticut
Prada – Los Angeles
Prada – 575 Broadway, New York City
Price Tower – Bartlesville, Oklahoma
Rachofsky House – Dallas, Texas
REI Flagship Store, Seattle
Reliance Building – Chicago
Richards Medical Research Laboratories – Philadelphia
Ronald Reagan Washington National Airport – Arlington, Virginia
Rosenthal Center for Contemporary Art – Cincinnati
Salk Institute – La Jolla, California
San Francisco Public Library – San Francisco
Sandra Day O'Connor United States Courthouse – Phoenix, Arizona
Seagram's Building – New York City
Frederick J. Smith House – Darien, Connecticut
Soldier Field – Chicago
Sony Plaza (AT&T Corporate Headquarters) – New York City
Staples Center – Los Angeles
Superdome – New Orleans
Tiffany and Company Building – New York City
Unity Temple – Oak Park, Illinois
University of Phoenix Stadium (Arizona Cardinals Stadium) – Glendale, Arizona
Vanna Venturi House – Chestnut Hill, Pennsylvania
Wainwright Building – St. Louis, Missouri
Washington Dulles International Airport – Chantilly, Virginia
Wexner Center for the Arts – Ohio State University – Columbus, Ohio
Whitney Museum – New York City
William J. Clinton Presidential Library – Little Rock, Arkansas

See also 

 Architecture of the United States

References

External links 
FavoriteArchitecture.org (Flash-based interactive photo exhibit of the listed buildings)
AIA 150, NPR.org (text-based list)
Americans' Favorite Buildings, The Wall Street Journal, February 7, 2007 (illustrated sortable list)
 America's Favorite Architecture on AIA Archiblog

Lists of buildings and structures in the United States
Opinion polling in the United States